Vetulonia densilirata is a species of sea snail, a marine gastropod mollusk, unassigned in the superfamily Seguenzioidea.

Description
The length of the shell attains 2 mm; its diameter: 3 mm.

(Original description) the shell resembles Vetulonia paucivaricosa (Dautzenberg, 1889) but with a depressed, almost flat spire. There are about 35 axial lamellae on the body whorl. The spiral sculpture is finer and closer, and the aperture is almost circular with a continuous margin.

Distribution
This marine species occurs off Florida, USA.

References

External links
 To Encyclopedia of Life
 To USNM Invertebrate Zoology Mollusca Collection
 To World Register of Marine Species

densilirata
Gastropods described in 1927